Leonhard Käär (14 April 1904 Viru-Nigula Parish, Kreis Wierland – 21 December 1963 New Jersey, USA) was an Estonian politician. He was a member of IV Riigikogu.

References

1904 births
1963 deaths
People from Viru-Nigula Parish
People from Kreis Wierland
Estonian Workers' Party politicians
Members of the Riigikogu, 1929–1932
Estonian World War II refugees
Estonian emigrants to the United States